Gahoe-dong is a dong, neighbourhood of Jongno-gu in Seoul, South Korea.

The area used to be an exclusive area for nobles, scholars, and homes of government officials hence it was well-maintained. Many of the hanok, Korean traditional houses, have been remodeled into cafe, restaurant and teahouses.

See also 
Gahoe Museum
Administrative divisions of South Korea

References

External links
 Jongno-gu Official site in English
 Status quo of Jongno-gu by administrative dong 
 Gahoe-dong Resident office 
 The origin of Gahoe-dong's name

Neighbourhoods of Jongno-gu